Prisca theologia ("ancient theology") is the doctrine that asserts that a single, true theology exists which threads through all religions, and which was anciently given by  God to humans.

History
The term prisca theologia appears to have been first used by Marsilio Ficino in the 15th century. Ficino and 
Giovanni Pico della Mirandola endeavored to reform the teachings of the Catholic Church by means of the writings of the prisca theologia, which they believed was reflected in Neoplatonism, Hermeticism, and the Chaldean Oracles, among other sources.

...[Ficino] saw himself as one member of a venerable sequence of interpreters who added to a store of wisdom that God allowed progressively to unfold. Each of these “prisci theologi,” or “ancient theologians,” had his part to play in discovering, documenting, and elaborating the truth contained in the writings of Plato and other ancient sages, a truth to which these sages may not have been fully privy, acting as they were as vessels of divine truth.
 

The Enlightenment tended to view all religion as cultural variations on a common anthropological theme; however, the Enlightenment, which tended to deny the validity of any form of revealed religion, held in very little esteem the idea of a prisca theologia.

The doctrine of a prisca theologia is held by, among others, Rosicrucianism.

Prisca theologia is distinguishable from the related concept of the perennial philosophy, although some inadvertently use the two terms interchangeably. An essential difference is that the prisca theologia is understood as existing in pure form only in ancient times and has undergone a process of continuous decline and dilution throughout modern times. In other words, the oldest religious principles and practices are held to be, in some sense, the purest. The perennial philosophy theory does not make this stipulation and merely asserts that the "true religion" periodically manifests itself in different times, places, and forms.  Both concepts, however, do suppose that there is such a thing as a true religion and tend to agree on the basic characteristics associated about this.

See also
 Esoteric Christianity
 Figurism
 Hanif, equivalent concept in Islam
 Pre-Adamite
 Urreligion
 Urmonotheismus

References

 Hanegraaff, Wouter J. "Tradition". In: Dictionary of Gnosis and Western Esotericism (Wouter J. Hanegraaff, ed.), pp. 1125–1135. Brill, 2006. .
 Hankins, James. Plato in the Italian Renaissance, 2 vols. Brill, 1990. .

Metaphysics of religion
Esoteric Christianity